The following is a list of World Chess Championships, including the hosting cities.

Before 1948, the matches were privately organised. After 1948, challengers were usually chosen by a Candidates Tournament.

List of World Chess Championships

Unofficial Championships (before 1886)
These matches and tournaments were not for the world championship, but retrospectively they have been fairly widely recognized as establishing the world's leading player at the time.

Pre-FIDE World Championships (1886–1946)
With Steinitz and Zukertort each having a claim to be the world's best player, the two played a match in 1886 for the first World Championship. From then until 1946, there was no formal system: matches were privately organized between the champion and challenger, and the challenger became the new World Champion if he won.

FIDE World Championships (1948–1990)

Alexander Alekhine died in 1946 while still World Chess Champion, after which the International Chess Federation (FIDE) organized the World Championships. This began with a one-off tournament in 1948. After that there was a 3-year cycle, in which a series of tournaments was held to decide the challenger, who then played the champion in a match for the World Championship.

Split title (1993–2006) 

In 1993, World Chess Champion Garry Kasparov and challenger Nigel Short split from FIDE, and played their title match under the auspices of the Professional Chess Association. In response, FIDE stripped Kasparov of his title and arranged its own World Championship match between former champion Anatoly Karpov and Candidates finalist Jan Timman. For the next 13 years there were two rival world titles. 

Beginning with the FIDE World Chess Championship 1996, FIDE changed its rules and the incumbent World Champion was no longer automatically qualified for the final match; but this tradition was maintained for the Classical title.

FIDE World Championships (2006–present)

The Classical and FIDE titles were unified with the 2006 match between Classical champion Vladimir Kramnik and FIDE champion Veselin Topalov. All subsequent championships have been administered by FIDE. Since 2008, FIDE has returned to the format of an incumbent champion playing a challenger.

Other

Multiple-title champions
Unofficial championships are not counted.

Notes

References

Further reading
Davidson, Henry A. (1949, 1981). A Short History of Chess. McKay. .
Barcza, Alföldy, Kapu: Die Weltmeister des Schachspiels. Hamburg 1975
Jens Enevoldsen: Verdens bedste Skak, Politiken (Denmark) 1966

World championship matches